Lincoln Heights is an unincorporated area and census-designated place (CDP) in Richland County, Ohio, United States. It was first listed as a CDP prior to the 2020 census.

The CDP is in east-central Richland County, in the center of the east part of Madison Township. It is bordered to the west by the city of Mansfield, to the east by unincorporated Wooster Heights and to the southwest by unincorporated East Mansfield. U.S. Route 42 (Ashland Road) forms the northwestern edge of the CDP. Route 42 leads northeast  to Ashland and southwest  to the center of Mansfield. Ohio State Route 430 (Wooster Road; former U.S. Route 30) forms the southern edge of the CDP; it leads west into Mansfield and east  to Wooster. State Route 39 (Lucas Road) leads southeast from Lincoln Heights  to Perrysville.

Demographics

References 

Census-designated places in Richland County, Ohio
Census-designated places in Ohio